Perito is a surname. Notable people with the surname include:

Miguel López Perito, Paraguayan politician
Nick Perito (1924–2005), American composer and arranger